
Gmina Bartniczka is a rural gmina (administrative district) in Brodnica County, Kuyavian-Pomeranian Voivodeship, in north-central Poland.

The gmina contains part of the protected area called Górzno-Lidzbark Landscape Park.

Villages
Gmina Bartniczka contains the villages and settlements of Bartniczka, Belfort, Długi Most, Gołkówko, Grążawy, Gutowo, Igliczyzna, Iły, Jastrzębie, Komorowo, Koziary, Łaszewo, Nowa Igliczyzna, Nowe Świerczyny, Radoszki, Samin, Skrobacja, Sokołowo, Stare Świerczyny, Świerczynki, Wilamowo and Zdroje.

Neighbouring gminas
Gmina Bartniczka is bordered by the gminas of Brodnica, Brzozie, Górzno, Lidzbark and Świedziebnia.

References

Polish official population figures 2006

External links
 The old website (archive)

Bartniczka
Brodnica County